Raúl Martínez may refer to:

Raúl Martínez (artist) (1927–1995), Cuban artist
Raúl L. Martínez (born 1949), American Democratic politician
Raúl Martínez (footballer) (born 1987), Mexican football midfielder
Raúl Martínez Sambulá (born 1963), Honduran football player
Raúl Martínez (fencer) (born 1926), Argentine Olympic fencer
Raúl Martínez Colomer (born 1988), Puerto Rican swimmer
Raúl Martínez (boxer) (born 1982), Mexican-American
Raúl Martínez (taekwondo), Spanish taekwondoka
Raúl Martínez (actor) (1920–1993), Mexican actor featured in ¿Por qué ya no me quieres?, Se solicitan modelos or La comadrita 
Raúl Martínez Solares, cinematographer, known from The Bandits of Cold River, Raffles or Women's Prison 
Raúl Martínez (wrestler), Cuban wrestler, 1991 and 1993 Greco-Roman world champion
Raúl Martínez (rally driver), Argentinian World Rally Championship driver
Raúl Martínez Crovetto (1921–1988), Argentinian botanist